Giants Tomb Island is an island with no permanent residents located in Southern Georgian Bay in Ontario, Canada. It measures approximately five kilometres from north to south and two kilometres from east to west.

Location
It is part of the Awenda Provincial Park close to Penetanguishene and Midland. To the west there are other islands, Christian Island, Hope Island and Beckwith Island. Beausoleil Island, part of the Georgian Bay Islands National Park is only a few kilometres to the east. The western shore is strewn with large granite boulders, and out into the bay.

History
Giants Tomb Islands name comes from its resemblance to a giant tomb, supposedly that of the giant native deity, Kitchikewana.

Giants Tomb Island Lighthouse
In 1892, the Department of Marine contracted Alphonse Tessier of Penetanguishene to construct a lighthouse to help warn mariners of Giants Tomb Island. Completed in 1893, the Department of Marine published the following details:
 Construction = Small wooden tower with dwelling attached painted white, the tower surmounted by an iron lantern painted red
 Height = 37 feet
 Light = Fixed white, elevated 40 feet above the level of the bay, and visible 11 miles

Later several amendments were done from the lighthouse keepers and after reconstruction to an unwatched flashing light in 1936, Giants Tomb Island Lighthouse remained in service until 1969.

Leisure
Giants Tomb Island is popular for day trips with boaters as there are excellent sandy beaches and safe swimming.
The south tip of the island or the beach on the east side are easy to access by kayak or canoe on a calm day. There are many shore line access points off the mainland, from Awenda Provincial Park, or from public beaches at Sawlog Bay and Kettle's Beach.

References

External links
 Information about the Lighthouse

Islands of Georgian Bay